is a Japanese voice actress.

Notable voice roles

Anime
Kamichama Karin (Miyon Yi)
Angelic Layer (Maria Shibata)
Boys Be... (Chiharu Nitta)
Digimon Adventure 02 (Jun Motomiya)
Devil Lady (Kazumi Takiura)
Full Metal Panic! (Dana)
Ginban Kaleidoscope (Kyōko Shitō)
Haibane Renmei (Nemu)
Magical Play (MyuMyu)
Magic User's Club (Saki Sawanoguchi)
Mirmo! (Saburou, Yamane, Chai)
Phi Brain: Puzzle of God (Shizuka Daimon)
Pokémon (Marina)
Puni Puni Poemi (Shii Aasu)
Shugo Chara! (Midori Hinamori)
Shugo Chara!! Doki- (Hinamori Midori, Kiran)
Speed Racer X (Mai Kazami)
Tokkoto Hamutarō (Ribon-chan)
Zegapain (Isola)
Black Rock Shooter (Mato's Mother)
Transformers: Prime (Airachind)
Healin' Good PreCure (Yasuko Hanadera)

Video games
Tokimeki Memorial 2 (Kaori Yae)

Dubbing

Live-action
Confessions of a Dangerous Mind (Debbie (Maggie Gyllenhaal))
From Vegas to Macau (Rainbow (Kimmy Tong))
The Legend of Zu (Dawn / Enigman (Cecilia Cheung))
Tom-Yum-Goong (Pla (Bongkoj Khongmalai))
Valentine (Shelley Fisher (Katherine Heigl))

Animation
Totally Spies! (Clover)

References

External links
 
Haikyou

1975 births
Living people
People from Nagoya
Japanese voice actresses
Japanese sopranos